11 Stanwix Street, formerly known as Westinghouse Tower, is one of the major distinctive and recognizable features of Downtown Pittsburgh, Pennsylvania, USA. The tower was originally built and named for the Westinghouse Corporation; in 1999 that company went through a restructuring and moved its headquarters to its longtime research park in the suburb of Monroeville, before expansions in their operations necessitated a move to a larger suburban complex in Cranberry Township. As of June 2009, the building tenants are IBM, the Allegheny Conference on Community Development, the advertising firm Brunner, and the local headquarters of KeyCorp.

11 Stanwix Street was completed on November 24, 1969, and has 23 floors. It rises 355 feet (108 meters) above Downtown Pittsburgh and is located along the Monongahela River. A ten-story building that once served as the city's main post was previously located on this site.

See also
List of tallest buildings in Pittsburgh

References

External links

Skyscraper office buildings in Pittsburgh
Headquarters in the United States
Harrison & Abramovitz buildings

Office buildings completed in 1969